Luca Martinelli is an Italian footballer who plays as a central defender for  club Catanzaro.

Career
In January 2013 Martinelli was signed by Juve Stabia outright. In summer 2013 half of the registration rights of Martinelli was exchanged with Yves Baraye of Chievo. Half of the registration rights of Baraye was valued for €500,000.

Martinelli returned to Juve Stabia in a temporary deal for 2013–14 season. In January 2014 Juve Stabia bought back Martinelli for an undisclosed fee, as well as Vincenzo Carrotta was sold to Juve Stabia for €400,000. Baraye also returned to Chievo in January for an undisclosed fee.

Empoli
In January 2014 Martinelli was signed by Empoli F.C. Juve Stabia signed Samuele Romeo in exchange. Both Martinelli and Romeo were valued for €1.5 million. On 1 September 2014 he was loaned to Novara, with Romano Perticone moved to Empoli. Martinelli also changed his Empoli shirt number from 3 to 58 in 2014, and again to 55 in 2015.

Messina
In summer 2015 he was sold to ACR Messina. He signed a 3-year contract in November 2015.

Foggia
On 10 July 2016 Martinelli was signed by Foggia in a 2-year contract.

Catanzaro
On 16 July 2019, he signed a 3-year contract with Catanzaro.

References

External links
 
 
 legaserieb profile

1988 births
Living people
Footballers from Milan
Italian footballers
Association football defenders
Serie A players
Serie B players
Serie C players
Lega Pro Seconda Divisione players
Calcio Lecco 1912 players
A.C. Mezzocorona players
A.S. Cittadella players
S.S. Juve Stabia players
Empoli F.C. players
Novara F.C. players
A.C.R. Messina players
Calcio Foggia 1920 players
U.S. Catanzaro 1929 players